The Fortress is a platform of Beacon Supergroup in Victoria Land, Antarctica, dissected to form four promontories bordered by cliffs over  high. Situated on the shoulder to the northeast of Webb Glacier, they form part of the divide between Webb Glacier and Victoria Upper Glacier. The feature was named by the Victoria University of Wellington Antarctic Expedition, 1959–60, for its fortress-like appearance.

References 

Mesas of Antarctica
Landforms of Victoria Land
Scott Coast